Ctenodrilidae is a family of polychaetes belonging to the order Terebellida.

Genera:
 Zeppelina Vaillant, 1890

References

Terebellida